Henry Kenneth Cassidy (September 14, 1893 – April 2, 1963) was an American football and basketball coach. He served as the 11th head football at Fairmount College—now known as Wichita State University—in Wichita, Kansas and he that position for the 1919 season, comping a record of 2–6–2. Cassidy was also the head basketball coach at Fairmount for one season, in 1919–20, tallying a mark of 8–8.

Cassidy was an alumnus of Fairmount College and Ottawa University. He served in France as a United States Army infantry officer during World War I. Cassidy died on April 2, 1963, at Palomar Memorial Hospital California in Escondido, California.

Head coaching record

Football

References

1893 births
1963 deaths
Basketball coaches from Kansas
Ottawa University alumni
Wichita State Shockers football coaches
Wichita State Shockers men's basketball coaches
Wichita State University alumni
United States Army personnel of World War I
United States Army officers
People from Fort Scott, Kansas